Camilla Fabricius (born 20 October 1971 in Aarhus) is a Danish politician, who is a member of the Folketing for the Social Democrats political party. She was elected into parliament at the 2019 Danish general election.

Political career
Fabricius was in the municipal council of Aarhus from 2008 to 2019. She was first elected into parliament in the 2019 election, where she received 6,506 votes.

External links 
 Biography on the website of the Danish Parliament (Folketinget)

References 

Living people
1971 births
People from Aarhus
21st-century Danish women politicians
Women members of the Folketing
Social Democrats (Denmark) politicians
Aarhus municipal council members
Members of the Folketing 2019–2022
Members of the Folketing 2022–2026